Sadek Bourguiba (born 25 May 1991), known by the mononym Sadek, is a French rapper from Neuilly-Plaisance, also known by aliases Johnny Niuuum and Sadek Niuum. He was signed to Hostile Records.

In 2007, he started in battle rap and freestyle rap, and performed during the streetball tournament "Le Quai 54" gaining favour when Mokobé asked for rappers to perform for 5 minutes. He also caught the attention of the event organizer Hammadoun Sidibé who encouraged him to launch a music project. He appeared on various compilations such as Street lourd, Capitale du Crime and cooperated with DJ Abdel for an album. Since then, he has released 3 mixtapes and one studio album with considerable chart success in France.

End of 2015, Sadek released 6 freestyle tracks under the collective title Roulette-Russe to announce his next project for 2016, Nique le Casino. Six tracks were chosen being a reference to the number of bullets that can be inserted in the cylinder of a .357 Magnum gun, a popular arm in practice of this deadly game.

In 2016, he co-starred with Gérard Depardieu in the film Tour de France.

On February 10, 2020, Sadek and three other people took part in the assault of French YouTuber Bassem Braïki. This attack comes after the cancellation on February 8 of a showcase in Saint-Priest, Rhône that Bassem called to disturb. After exchanging messages and sending an address, the rapper and his team went to the blogger's home and beat him on the ground with batons and kicks. Videos of the attack taken by Sadek himself were posted on Snapchat and Twitter.

In January 2023, he announced that his album Changement de propriétaire will be released on 27 January. The album does not include any featuring.

Discography

Albums

Mixtapes

Singles

*Did not appear in the official Belgian Ultratop 50 charts, but rather in the bubbling under Ultratip charts.

Other songs

Featured in

*Did not appear in the official Belgian Ultratop 50 charts, but rather in the bubbling under Ultratip charts.

References

External links
Official website
Facebook

French rappers
1991 births
Living people
Rappers from Seine-Saint-Denis
French people of Tunisian descent